Oxygen isotope ratio cycles are cyclical variations in the ratio of the abundance of oxygen with an atomic mass of 18 to the abundance of oxygen with an atomic mass of 16 present in some substances, such as polar ice or calcite in ocean core samples, measured with the isotope fractionation. The ratio is linked to water temperature of ancient oceans, which in turn reflects ancient climates. Cycles in the ratio mirror climate changes in geologic history.

Isotopes of oxygen 

Oxygen (chemical symbol O) has three naturally occurring isotopes: 16O, 17O, and 18O, where the 16, 17 and 18 refer to the atomic mass. The most abundant is 16O, with a small percentage of 18O and an even smaller percentage of 17O. Oxygen isotope analysis considers only the ratio of 18O to 16O present in a sample.

The calculated ratio of the masses of each present in the sample is then compared to a standard, which can yield information about the temperature at which the sample was formed - see Proxy (climate) for details.

Connection between isotopes and temperature/weather 

18O is two neutrons heavier than 16O and causes the water molecule in which it occurs to be heavier by that amount. The additional mass changes the hydrogen bonds so that more energy is required to vaporize H218O than H216O, and H218O liberates more energy when it condenses. In addition, H216O tends to diffuse more rapidly.

Because H216O requires less energy to vaporize, and is more likely to diffuse to the liquid phase, the first water vapor formed during evaporation of liquid water is enriched in H216O, and the residual liquid is enriched in H218O. When water vapor condenses into liquid, H218O preferentially enters the liquid, while H216O is concentrated in the remaining vapor.

As an air mass moves from a warm region to a cold region, water vapor condenses and is removed as precipitation. The precipitation removes H218O, leaving progressively more H216O-rich water vapor. This distillation process causes precipitation to have lower 18O/16O as the temperature decreases. Additional factors can affect the efficiency of the distillation, such as the direct precipitation of ice crystals, rather than liquid water, at low temperatures.

Due to the intense precipitation that occurs in hurricanes, the H218O is exhausted relative to the H216O, resulting in relatively low 18O/16O ratios. The subsequent uptake of hurricane rainfall in trees, creates a record of the passing of hurricanes that can be used to create a historical record in the absence of human records.

In laboratories, the temperature, humidity, ventilation and so on affect the accuracy of oxygen isotope measurements. Solid samples (organic and inorganic) for oxygen isotope measurements are usually stored in silver cups and measured with pyrolysis and mass spectrometry. Researchers need to avoid improper or prolonged storage of the samples for accurate measurements.

Connection between temperature and climate 

The 18O/16O ratio provides a record of ancient water temperature. Water 10 to 15 °C (18 to 27 °F) cooler than present represents glaciation. As colder temperatures spread toward the equator, water vapor rich in 18O preferentially rains out at lower latitudes. The remaining water vapor that condenses over higher latitudes is subsequently rich in 16O.  Precipitation and therefore glacial ice contain water with a low 18O content. Since large amounts of 16O water are being stored as glacial ice, the 18O content of oceanic water is high. Water up to 5 °C (9 °F) warmer than today represents an interglacial, when the 18O content of oceanic water is lower. A plot of ancient water temperature over time indicates that climate has varied cyclically, with large cycles and harmonics, or smaller cycles, superimposed on the large ones. This technique has been especially valuable for identifying glacial maxima and minima in the Pleistocene.

Connection between calcite and water 

Limestone is deposited from the calcite shells of microorganisms. Calcite, or calcium carbonate, chemical formula CaCO3, is formed from water, H2O, and carbon dioxide, CO2, dissolved in the water. The carbon dioxide provides two of the oxygen atoms in the calcite. The calcium must rob the third from the water. The isotope ratio in the calcite is therefore the same, after compensation, as the ratio in the water from which the microorganisms of a given layer extracted the material of the shell.  A higher abundance of 18O in calcite is indicative of colder water temperatures, since the lighter isotopes are all stored in the glacial ice.  The microorganism most frequently referenced for identifying marine isotope stages is foraminifera.

Research 
Earth's dynamic oxygenation evolution is recorded in ancient sediments from the Republic of Gabon from between about 2,150 and 2,080 million years ago. Responsible for these fluctuations in oxygenation were likely driven by the Lomagundi carbon isotope excursion.

See also 
 δ18O
 Isotope fractionation

References 

 Encyclopædia Britannica under Climate and Weather, Pleistocene Climatic Change

External links
NASA Earth Observatory: The Oxygen Balance 
Scripps O2 Global Oxygen Measurements

Paleoclimatology
Geochronological dating methods
Oxygen